Rawcliffe may refer to:

Places
Rawcliffe, East Riding of Yorkshire
location of Rawcliffe railway station
Rawcliffe Bridge, East Riding of Yorkshire
Rawcliffe, North Yorkshire, a village located in the City of York

Other uses
Rawcliffe (surname)

See also 
Out Rawcliffe (Lancashire)